Look is a surname. Notable people with the surname include:

Bruce Look (born 1943), American baseball player
Dean Look (born 1937), American football and baseball player
Kairi Look (born 1983), Estonian children's author
Simon Look (born 1958), Israeli footballer

See also
Gerrit van Look (born 1985), German rugby union player

Estonian-language surnames